Mike del Mundo is a comic book artist.

Early years 
Mike del Mundo was born in 1980. His father was a musician, his mother was a teacher. The Filipino-born Canadian student was an active b-boy. He took part a competitions between Canada and the UK.

Style 
Mike del Mundo's work looks like a story. He gives the feeling of action with blurred lines. Mike draws in a bright colors. He provides a many details. He can tell a story without any words.

He is best known for his cover art, as well as his interior work on titles such as Weirdworld and Avengers.

Awards

Eisner Award

Harvey Award

Joe Shuster Award

Bibliography

Marvel Comics

Main artist
Uncanny X-Men #17 (2012)
A+X #2 (2013)
Superior Spider-Man Team-Up #3-4 (2013)
Elektra #1-5 and #8-11 (2014-2015)
All-New X-Men #37 (2015)
Weirdworld #1-5 (2015)
Weirdworld #1-6 (2016)
Totally Awesome Hulk #9 (2016)
Avengers #1-6 and #9-11 (2017)
Astonishing X-Men #6 (2017)
Inhumans: Judgment Day One-shot (2017)
Thor #1-4 (2018) (ongoing)

Contributor
The Amazing Spider-Man #647 (2010)
Fear Itself: The Home Front #3 (2011)
Guardians of the Galaxy: Tomorrow's Avengers One-shot (2013)
Mighty Thor #700 (2017)

References

External links

Mike del Mundo at Marvel.com

Filipino comics artists

Living people
Year of birth missing (living people)